Tizej (also Romanized as Tīzej and Tīzaj) is a village in Fin Rural District, Fin District, Bandar Abbas County, Hormozgan Province, Iran. At the 2006 census, its population was 98, in 27 families.

References 

Populated places in Bandar Abbas County